The second USS Emerald (SP-177) was an armed yacht that served in the United States Navy as a patrol vessel from 1917 to 1918.

Emerald was built as the civilian yacht Emrose in either 1906 or 1916 by Pusey and Jones at Wilmington, Delaware for A. W. Rose of New York City. She later became the property of Maxwell Wyeth of Philadelphia, Pennsylvania, and was renamed Emerald.

The U.S. Navy acquired Emerald from Wyeth on 23 July 1917 for World War I service as a patrol vessel and placed her in service that day as USS Emerald (SP-177). Sources differ on whether she was commissioned or served in non-commissioned status.

For the rest of World War I, Emerald served in the 4th Naval District on harbor entrance patrol duty in Delaware Bay.

Emerald was taken out of service on 12 December 1918 and returned to Wyeth.

Notes

References

Department of the Navy: Naval Historical Center: Online Library of Selected Images: U.S. Navy Ships: USS Emerald (SP-177), 1917-1918
NavSource Online: Section Patrol Craft Photo Archive Emerald (SP-177)

Patrol vessels of the United States Navy
World War I patrol vessels of the United States
Individual yachts
Ships built by Pusey and Jones
1906 ships
1916 ships